Yui Kamiji and Jordanne Whiley defeated the three-time defending champion Diede de Groot and her partner Marjolein Buis in the final, 6–3, 6–3 to win the women's doubles wheelchair tennis title at the 2020 US Open. With the win, Kamiji completed the triple career Grand Slam and Whiley completed the double career Grand Slam.

De Groot and Aniek van Koot were the reigning champions, but van Koot chose not to participate.

Seeds

Draw

Bracket

References

External links 
 Draw

Wheelchair Women's Doubles
U.S. Open, 2020 Women's Doubles